Ahmed Hussen  (born 1976) is a Canadian lawyer and politician who has been serving as the minister of housing and diversity and inclusion since October 26, 2021. A member of the Liberal Party, Hussen has also sat as the member of Parliament (MP) for the Toronto-area the riding of York South—Weston since the 2015 federal election. He previously served as the minister of families, children and social development from 2019 to 2021 and the minister of immigration, refugees and citizenship from 2017 to 2019. He is the first Somali-Canadian to be elected to the House of Commons and the first to hold a federal Cabinet position.

Early life and education
Hussen was born and raised in Mogadishu, Somalia. He has five older siblings and his father was a long-distance trucker. Hussen learned to speak English there from a cousin. He and his family left Mogadishu after the Somali Civil War reached their neighbourhood. He described his experience in the civil war: "I was 15 years old when Somalia was going through a civil war. There were chaos and violence everywhere. My parents and I decided that we had no choice but to flee. We gathered a few belongings, got on the back of a big truck with a few other families, left Somalia never to return". They lived for a period of time in Kenya, in a camp in Mombasa and several apartments in Nairobi.

Two years after leaving Mogadishu, Hussen moved to Canada as a refugee, when his parents bought him an airplane ticket to Toronto, where two of his brothers had already moved. He initially resided with a cousin in Hamilton, and moved to Toronto in 1994, where he settled in Regent Park in 1996.

Hussen completed secondary school in Hamilton. Due to a Canadian government policy that delayed granting permanent residency status to emigrants from Somalia, he had to decline three athletic running scholarships to universities in the United States. Hussen eventually attended York University, where he earned a BA in History in 2002. Having received a law degree from the University of Ottawa, and passed the bar exam in September 2012, he specialized in the practice of immigration and criminal law.

Hussen is married to Ebyan Farah, a fellow Somali-Canadian refugee. Together, they have three sons.

Early career
Hussen began his career in public service and politics in the fall of 2001. He started out doing volunteer work in Legislative Assembly of Ontario. He was hired the following year as an assistant to Ontario Liberal leader Dalton McGuinty, then-leader of the province's Official Opposition. Hussen was promoted to special assistant, concurrent with McGuinty's 2003 election as the premier of Ontario. He held this new post for two years, during which he was in charge of issues management, policy and communications.

Hussen later worked with the Royal Canadian Mounted Police's Youth Engaged in National Security Issues committee.

He also founded the Regent Park Community Council. The representative body facilitated a $500 million revitalization and redevelopment project in Regent Park, the largest such initiative in the country. During the project's implementation, he was tasked with consulting with and protecting the interests of over 15,000 residents.

Hussen currently serves as the national president of the Canadian Somali Congress (CSC). Under his leadership, the CSC partnered with the Canadian International Peace Project and Canadian Jewish Congress to establish the Canadian Somali-Jewish Mentorship Project. It is the first national mentoring and development project between a sizable Muslim community and the Jewish community.

In May 2010, the Canadian Somali Congress and Canadian International Peace Project also partnered with the Global Enrichment Foundation to launch the Somali Women Scholarship Program. Hussen acts as the program's founding director.

Until 2012, Hussen served as a sitting member of the Harper government's Cross-Cultural Roundtable on Security. Established in 2005, the panel brought together prominent members from a number of Canada's cultural communities and government officials in order to discuss policy and program issues, and to promote dialogue and strengthen understanding between the national authorities and its electorate.

Political career

Member of Parliament for York South—Weston
In December 2014, Hussen presented himself as a candidate for a Liberal Party of Canada seat in the riding of York South—Weston for the 42nd Canadian federal election. He won the nomination in a field of six aspirants. The victory makes Hussen the first Somali-Canadian elected to the House of Commons.

Minister of Immigration, Citizenship and Refugees
On January 10, 2017, Hussen was appointed minister of immigration as part of a Cabinet shuffle by Prime Minister Justin Trudeau. The nomination makes Hussen the first Somali-Canadian to serve in the government cabinet.

As immigration minister, Hussen announced on 2017 the Government of Canada will welcome nearly one million immigrants over the next three years. The number of migrants would climb to 310,000 in 2018, up from 300,000 in 2017. That number was to rise to 330,000 in 2019 then 340,000 in 2020.

On October 31, 2018, Hussen announced that the Government of Canada had updated its multi-year immigration levels plan, which would see the number of new immigrants in Canada rise to 350,000 by 2021. This plan was to see immigration levels rise by 40,000 more than Canada's target of 310,000 immigrants in 2018. The planned increases were set to reflect needs in the economic class of immigration to aid with Canada's labour shortages, as well as in humanitarian streams of immigration.

In a 2018, Angus Reid Institute poll found that Hussen is one of the least popular ministers in Trudeau's cabinet.

Minister of Families, Children and Social Development 
Hussen was shuffled to the families, children and social development portfolio following the 2019 federal election.

Minister of Housing and Diversity and Inclusion 
After the Liberals won the 2021 federal election, Prime Minister Justin Trudeau kept Hussen in his cabinet, moving him to the housing and diversity and inclusion file.

In August 2022, it was discovered that Hussen's department had given a $133,000 grant to the Community Media Advocacy Centre (CMAC), an organization whose senior consultant has a history of anti-semitism. Fellow Liberal MP Anthony Housefather claims that he told Minister Hussen about the anti-semetic consultant before the news broke, and that Hussen and his department could have moved quicker to cut CMAC's funding.

Awards
Hussen has over the years received honours and recognition for his public work. In January 2004, the Toronto Star named him among the 10 individuals who have made significant contributions to Toronto in various fields, including community service, business, sports and science. In 2017, Hussen was presented with the Top 25 Canadian Immigrant Awards, an award that honours the achievements of immigrants who have chosen to make Canada their home.

Hussen was also presented a Queen's Gold and Diamond Jubilee medal. He also received the Ontario Non-Profit Housing Authority Award for his efficacious advocacy work in Regent Park.

Electoral record

References

External links
 Official Website
 Bio & mandate from the prime minister

American Islamic Leadership Coalition – Ahmed Hussen 

Living people
Ethnic Somali people
Lawyers in Ontario
Black Canadian lawyers
Somalian activists
Black Canadian activists
Somalian Muslims
Canadian Muslims
Somalian emigrants to Canada
University of Ottawa alumni
York University alumni
Liberal Party of Canada MPs
Members of the House of Commons of Canada from Ontario
Members of the King's Privy Council for Canada
Members of the 29th Canadian Ministry
1976 births
People from Vaughan